Podanthus is a genus of Chilean plants in the tribe Heliantheae within the family Asteraceae.

 Species
 Podanthus mitiqui Lindl. - Chile (Coquimbo, Santiago, Maule, Valparaíso, O'Higgins)
 Podanthus ovatifolius Lag. - Chile (Biobío, Coquimbo, Maule, La Araucania, Valparaíso, O'Higgins)

References

Heliantheae
Asteraceae genera
Endemic flora of Chile
Taxa named by Mariano Lagasca